Blas Infante Pérez de Vargas (5 July 1885 – 11 August 1936) was a Spanish Andalusist politician, Georgist, writer, historian and musicologist, known as the father of Andalusian nationalism (Padre de la Patria Andaluza).

Infante was a Georgist idealist who initiated an assembly at Ronda in 1913. This assembly adopted a charter based on  the autonomist Constitución Federal de Antequera written in 1883 during the First Spanish Republic. It also embraced the current flag and emblem as "national symbols", designed by Infante himself based on various historic Andalusian standards. During the Second Spanish Republic, the Andalucismo was represented by the Junta Liberalista, a federalist political party led by Infante.

Infante was among numerous political figures who were summarily executed by Franco's forces when they took over Seville at the beginning of the Spanish Civil War. As both a regional autonomist and a kind of libertarian socialist, he twice "merited" inclusion on their liquidation list.

His last residence in Coria del Río now hosts the Museum of Andalusian Autonomy.

Published works

La Obra de Costa (1916)
La Sociedad de Naciones (with J. Andrés Vázquez, 1917)

Motamid, último rey de Sevilla (1920)
Cuentos de Animales (1921)
Los Mandamientos de Dios a favor de los animales (1921)
La Dictadura pedagógica (1921)
Reelección Fundamental – Primer Volumen – La Religión y la Moral (1921)
Orígenes de lo flamenco y secreto del cante jondo (1929–31)
La verdad sobre el complot de Tablada y el Estado libre de Andalucía (1931)
Cartas Andalucistas de Septiembre de 1935 (1935)
Manifiesto a todos los andaluces (1936)

Unpublished works
Fundamentos de Andalucía – 1ª serie de Cartas Andalucistas (unpublished, 1929)
El Libro Nuevo (unpublished)
Almanzor (unpublished)

In popular culture

The 2003 film Una pasión singular by Antonio Gonzalo features the life of Blas Infante.

Notes

1885 births
1936 deaths
Andalusian nationalists
Spanish politicians
Spanish male writers
Georgist politicians
People from the Province of Málaga
People executed by Francoist Spain
Executed Spanish people
National anthem writers